While Parents Sleep is a comedy play by the British writer Anthony Kimmins, which was first staged in 1932. It ran for 492 performances during its initial West End run, first at the Royalty Theatre and then transferring to the Garrick. The original cast included Nigel Playfair, Hugh Williams, Jack Hawkins and Diana Beaumont. It was revived again in 1933 for a further 315 performances. Its 1934 Broadway run was much shorter, lasting for only 16 performances at the Playhouse Theatre.

Synopsis
Two brothers invited their girlfriends over to their house, causing immense disruption to the lives of their parents.

Film Adaptation
In 1935 the play served as the basis of the film While Parents Sleep directed by Adrian Brunel and starring Jean Gillie and Enid Stamp Taylor.

References

Bibliography
 Wearing, J.P. The London Stage 1930-1939: A Calendar of Productions, Performers, and Personnel.  Rowman & Littlefield, 2014.

External links

1932 plays
Plays set in England
British plays adapted into films